South Ossetia does not issue visas. However, visitors are required to receive approval from the South Ossetian government in advance of their visit unless they are citizens of an exempt country. Because South Ossetia is only accessible through Russia, visitors are also required to hold a valid Russian visa that permits them to return to Russia unless they are Russian citizens or citizens of countries that are exempt from Russian visa requirements.

Entry requirements

South Ossetia may only be entered through Russia. 

All visitors, except for citizens of exempt countries, must be invited by a party in South Ossetia (a private citizen or a South Ossetian organization, such as a government department or business) prior to their arrival. Inviting parties must submit their invitation letters to the Immigration Control Office of the Ministry of Internal Affairs, which takes up to 30 calendar days to process invitations. Tourists must obtain an invitation from the Committee on Youth Policy, Sports, and Tourism. In addition to an invitation, journalists must receive approval from the State Committee on Information and Press prior to arrival. All visitors must register with the Immigration Control Office of the Ministry of Internal Affairs within three days after their arrival.

Prior approval exemption

All members of the Community for Democracy and Rights of Nations have agreed to abolish mutual visa requirements for their citizens.

A mutual free-travel agreement between South Ossetia and Nauru was signed on February 3, 2018, that would allow citizens of Nauru to travel to South Ossetia without prior approval and for citizens of South Ossetia to travel to Nauru without a visa, both for up to 90 days within any 180 day period. However, the agreement has yet to be ratified.

Visitors statistics 
Approximately 95% of the population of South Ossetia has (in addition to citizenship of the Republic of South Ossetia — State of Alania), citizenship of the Russian Federation, and many of them leave the territory of South Ossetia and enter it with Russian passports, and almost half of them permanently reside in Russia. During the year, most of them leave South Ossetia for Russia many times for various purposes and enter back. Even from Russian citizens by birth, South Ossetia is mostly visited by Russian citizens living mainly in Republic of North Ossetia–Alania (part of the Russian Federation). From the rest of the Russian Federation, an extremely small number of citizens of the Russian Federation visit South Ossetia.

Citizens of the Russian Federation

See also

Visa requirements for South Ossetian citizens
International recognition of Abkhazia and South Ossetia
Foreign relations of South Ossetia
Visa policy of Georgia
Visa policy of Russia
Visa policy of Abkhazia
Visa policy of Artsakh
Visa policy of Transnistria

References

South Ossetia
Foreign relations of South Ossetia